A pelvic examination is the physical examination of the external and internal female pelvic organs. It is frequently used in gynecology for the evaluation of symptoms affecting the female reproductive and urinary tract, such as pain, bleeding, discharge, urinary incontinence, or trauma (e.g. sexual assault). It can also be used to assess a woman's anatomy in preparation for procedures. The exam can be done awake in the clinic and emergency department, or under anesthesia in the operating room. The most commonly performed components of the exam are 1) the external exam, to evaluate the external genitalia 2) the internal exam with palpation (commonly called the bimanual exam) to examine the uterus, ovaries, and fallopian tubes, and 3) the internal exam using the speculum to visualize the vaginal walls and cervix. During the pelvic exam, sample of cells and fluids may be collected to screen for sexually transmitted infections or cancer.

Some clinicians perform a pelvic exam as part of routine preventive care. However, in 2014, the American College of Physicians published guidelines against routine pelvic examination in adult women who are not pregnant and lack symptoms, with the exception of pelvic exams done as part of cervical cancer screening.

Medical guidelines

Previous to July 2014, the benefits of routine pelvic examinations were not clear and there was no consensus. Since then, American College of Physicians (ACP) issued a guideline that recommended against performing this examination to screen for conditions in asymptomatic, nonpregnant, adult women. (The guideline did not consider pap smears.) The ACP said that there was no evidence of benefit in support of the examination, but there was evidence of harm, including distress and unnecessary surgery. This was a strong recommendation, based on moderate-quality evidence. In 2018, the American College of Obstetricians and Gynecologists (ACOG) issued a committee opinion that pelvic exams should be performed for 1) symptoms of gynecologic disease, 2) screening for cervical dysplasia, or 3) management of gynecologic disorders or malignancy, using shared decision-making with the patient. ACOG concluded there is inadequate data to support recommendations for or against routine screening pelvic examination for asymptomatic, non-pregnant women with average risk for gynecologic disease.

Annual "well-woman exams" are an occasion for gynecologists to recognize issues like incontinence and sexual dysfunction, and discuss patient concerns, and an exam can be done if indicated by the clinical history.

Preparation, communication, and trauma-informed care 

The examination can be emotionally and physically uncomfortable for women. Preparation, good communication, thoughtful technique, and trauma-informed care can help mitigate this discomfort.

Careful preparation is helpful for an efficient and comfortable exam. Prior to asking the patient to position herself on the exam table, the examiner should collect all the instruments needed for the exam and any planned procedures, including the speculum, light source, lubricant, gloves, drapes, and specimen collection media. Warming the speculum with warm tap water will also increase comfort. The patient should be given the opportunity to have a chaperone or support person in the room during the exam. In general, male examiners should always be accompanied by a female chaperone.

Prior to the exam, before the patient is undressed and lying on the table, examiners should ask the patient if she has had a pelvic exam in the past and whether she has any questions or concerns about the exam. Women may be concerned about pain, or they may be embarrassed about the examination of sensitive areas of the body. They may have experienced sexual assault or negative experiences with pelvic examination in the past, which may lead to the exam triggering strong emotional and physical symptoms. Additionally, patients may have concern about odor or menstruation during exam, neither of which should impact the examiner's ability to perform a thorough, respectful exam. Patients generally prefer to be asked about past experiences and are often helpful in suggesting ways to mitigate the discomfort of the exam.

Prior to the exam, the examiner should offer to show the patient models or diagrams of the pelvic anatomy and any instruments that will be used during the exam. The examiner should explain each step of the exam and its purpose, should address and normalize any concerns, should assert that the patient has full control over the exam, and should ask permission before each step of the exam. The examiner should keep as much of the patient's body covered as possible during the exam. Relaxation of the pelvic muscles can reduce discomfort during the exam. Rather than telling the patient to "relax", which can trigger strong emotions for women who are survivors of assault, patients can be told to breathe slowly and deeply into their abdomens, which is a more instructive way of describing how to relax the pelvic muscles.

The patient should be informed that she can stop the procedure at any time. If the patient does not want to continue the exam, the examiner should stop, speak with the patient about her concerns and how to mitigate them, and only continue when the patient is ready to do so. However, in all but seven states in the United States, it is legal for pelvic exams to be done under anesthesia without the patient's consent.

External examination

The pelvic exam begins with an explanation of the procedure. The patient is asked to put on an examination gown, get on the examination table, and lay on her back with her feet in footholds. Sliding down toward the end of the table is the best position for the clinician to do a visual examination. A pelvic exam begins with an assessment of the reproductive organs that can be seen without the use of a speculum. Many women may want to 'prepare' for the procedure. One possible reason for delaying an exam is if it is to be done during menstruation, but this is a preference of some patients and not a requirement of the clinician. The clinician may want to perform pelvic examination and assessment of the vagina because there are unexplained symptoms of vaginal discharge, pelvic pain, unexpected bleeding, or urinary problems.

The typical external examination begins with making sure that the patient is in a comfortable position and her privacy respected.

 In some instances, different positioning and assistance may be required to keep tissue from blocking the view of the perineal area.
 The pubic hair is inspected for pubic lice and hair growth patterns. Sparse hair patterns can exist in older and in some Asian patients.
 The labia majora are evaluated. Their position and symmetry are assessed. The expected finding in older patients is that the labia majora can be thinner and smaller. The examiner is looking for ulcers, inflammation, warts and rashes. If drainage is present from these structures, its color, location and other characteristics are noted. Infection control is accomplished by frequent glove changes.
 The labia minora are then evaluated. They should appear moist, smooth in texture and pink. The presence of tearing, inflammation and swelling is noted. Thinner and smaller labia minora are an expected finding in older patients.
 The clitoris is assessed for size, position, symmetry, and inflammation.
 The urethral opening is inspected. No urine should leak when the patient is asked to cough. Urine leakage may indicate stress incontinence and the weakening of pelvic structures. The opening should be midline, pink, and smooth. The presence of inflammation or discharge may indicate an infection. Excoriation can be present in obese patients due to urinary incontinence.
 The vaginal opening is inspected for position, presence of the hymen, and shape. The examiner should look for the presence of bruising, tearing, inflammation and discharge. Pelvic examinations are usually procedures that are designed to obtain objective, measurable descriptions of what is observed. If sexual abuse is suspected, questions regarding this are discussed after the examination and not during it. When the patient is requested to 'bear down', the presence of prolapsed structures such as the bladder (cystocele), rectum (rectocele) or uterus are documented. Prolapsed structures can appear when abdominal pressure increases or they can protrude without bearing down.
 The perineum, the space between the vagina and the anus, is inspected. It should be smooth, firm, and free of disease. Scars from episiotomies are visible on women who have had the procedure during childbirth.
 The anus is assessed for lesions, inflammation or trauma. It should appear dark, continuous and moist. In some patients, excoriation may be present, and can be a sign of fecal incontinence.

Internal examination

Before inserting the speculum, the vaginal wall, urethra, Skene's glands and Bartholin's glands are palpated through the vaginal wall. During the internal exam, the examiner describes the procedure while doing the assessment, making sure that the patient can anticipate where she will feel the palpations.

 The patient is first informed that the examiner will insert their finger into the vagina. The palpation of the vagina is done by evaluating the condition of the vaginal walls. These should feel smooth, consistent and soft. The rugae can also be assessed by palpation.
 The patient is again asked to bear down while the examiner continues the internal examination. The presence of bulging is assessed.
 The position of the urethra is assessed by palpation with a finger through the vaginal wall.
 The Skene's glands, located on each side of the urethra, are palpated to produce secretion from the glands.
 The Bartholin glands are also assessed internally by gently squeezing them with one finger placed externally, on the posterior labia majora and the other finger in the vagina.

At this point of the pelvic exam, the examiner will insert the speculum to visualize other internal structures: the cervix, uterus, and ovaries. If this is the first pelvic exam of the patient, the examiner will show the speculum to the patient, explain its use and answer any questions.

 The appropriate sized speculum is selected. The speculum is slowly inserted in its collapsed state at a 45 degree angle to match the slope of the vagina. The blades are then expanded until the cervix comes into view. If the speculum is transparent, the vaginal walls can be seen.
 The cervix is then assessed. It should look moist, round, pink, and centered to the middle. The secretions of the cervix should be clear or whitish with no odor. The presence or absence of polyps, ulcers, and inflammation are noted.
 A swab or cytobrush will be used to collect or scrape cervical cells off of the surface of the cervix to be evaluated for changes. Other vaginal swabs can be taken at this time to test for sexually transmitted diseases.

The next part of the pelvic exam is the bimanual palpation and begins after the speculum is removed.

 The examiner informs and explains this part of the exam. Two fingers are used to palpate the cervix.
 The cervix and fornices are assessed for mobility and the presence of lumps.
 The uterus is palpated and evaluated to determine its position by leaving the fingers of one hand in the vagina while pressure to the abdomen is applied with the other hand. If the body tissue is too thick due to obesity, an ultrasound may be performed instead.
 If the examiner can feel the fallopian tubes, this is not a normal finding.
 The examiner removes their hands and puts on clean gloves to assess the rectum, and explains this part of the exam to the patient.
 The rectum is assessed by having one finger in the vagina and the other in the rectum. The rectum should be smooth.

The examiner removes their fingers, discards their gloves, washes their hands and helps the patient get into an upright position. Any deviations from what is considered normal will be discussed.

During pregnancy 
Prenatal care includes pelvic exams during the pregnancy. Women with high risk pregnancies see their obstetrician more often. These are:
 Very young age or older than 35
 Overweight or underweight
 Problems in previous pregnancy
 Health conditions present before the start of pregnancy, such as high blood pressure, diabetes, autoimmune disorders, cancer, and HIV
 Pregnancy with twins or other multiples

The pelvic exam during pregnancy is similar to the exam for non-pregnant women. One difference is that more attention is give to the uterus and cervix. The growth of the uterus is measured each visit, although this does not require a pelvic exam. As the due date approaches, the assessment of the cervix will indicate whether labor has begun or is progressing. Much time is spent determining the health of the fetus. A normal finding during the exam on the pregnant patient is that the cervix has a bluish tinge in early pregnancy. If a bluish tinge is observed in non-pregnant women, this is a sign of hypoxia.

See also 
 Well-woman examination
 Pap test
Trauma-Informed Care

References 

Female genital procedures